Peter J. Sowers House is a historic home located at Palmyra, Marion County, Missouri.  It was built in 1855, and is a two-story, transitional Greek Revival / Italianate style painted brick dwelling. It has a small rear wing and conservatory added in the 1870s.  It has low hipped roofs with modillioned cornices and a stone foundation.

It was added to the National Register of Historic Places in 1985.

References

Houses on the National Register of Historic Places in Missouri
Greek Revival houses in Missouri
Italianate architecture in Missouri
Houses completed in 1855
Buildings and structures in Marion County, Missouri
National Register of Historic Places in Marion County, Missouri